Nicola Anne Coles (married name Austin; born 7 January 1972 in Auckland) is a New Zealand rower.

In 2001, she won silver at the World Championships in Lucerne, Switzerland as stroke in the four with teammates Jackie Abraham-Lawrie (bow), Kate Robinson (2), and Rochelle Saunders (3).

References 

1972 births
Living people
Rowers from Auckland
Rowers at the 2004 Summer Olympics
Rowers at the 2008 Summer Olympics
Olympic rowers of New Zealand
World Rowing Championships medalists for New Zealand
New Zealand female rowers
21st-century New Zealand women